Channel 4's Comedy Gala of 2011 is a British comedy benefit show organised by Channel 4. It is the second Channel 4 Comedy Gala, an annual charity event held O2 Arena in London in aid of the Great Ormond Street Children's Hospital. It was filmed live on 24 May 2011, then broadcast on Channel 4 on 10 June 2011. The first Comedy Gala was held 30 March 2010 and broadcast on 5 April 2010. Billed by Channel 4 as "the biggest live stand up show in UK history", it featured seventeen comedians performing stand-up, as well as a number of others performing live and pre-recorded sketches. The first gala raised money for a new anaesthetic room, while the second aims to raise money for a new operating theatre.

Beneficiary
As with the 2010 gala, the 2011 performance was in aid of the Great Ormond Street Children's Hospital. The 2011 proceeds were to go towards funding a new 24-hour operating theatre, costing £5 million. The new theatre would reduce waiting times at the hospital for the children treated from across the UK with life-saving heart, brain and spinal surgery. As with the 2010 show, the performers were to give their time for free for the gala.

History
On 10 March 2011, Michael McIntyre and John Bishop visited a cardiac ward of the hospital with the Daily Mirror, who announced a second comedy gala at the O2 in aid of the hospital was to be held on 24 May 2011. To be filmed and broadcast on Channel 4 at a later date, tickets were due to go on sale the next day, at 9am. Channel 4 confirmed this with an announcement on its Comedy Gala website the next day. While tickets went on general sale that day at 9am, a pre-sale begun at 9am the day before.

As with the 2010 gala, the 2011 show was commissioned by the Channel 4 commissioning editor Syeda Irtizaali, the promoter was Off the Kerb Productions and it was to be filmed by Open Mike Productions.

The gig at the O2 was to open at 6.30pm.

Participants
When the second gala was announced, the confirmed line-up included the following performers:

 Alan Carr
 Andi Osho
 Chris Moyles
 Dara Ó Briain
 Jack Dee
 Jack Whitehall
 Jo Brand
 John Bishop
 Jon Richardson
 Jonathan Ross
 Kevin Bridges
 Lee Evans
 Mark Watson
 Michael McIntyre
 Micky Flanagan
 Paul Kaye
 Rhod Gilbert
 Rich Hall
 Sarah Millican
 Sean Lock
 Shappi Khorsandi

Promoters Off the Kerb also listed the following acts:
 Jason Byrne
 Jason Manford
 Noel Fielding
 N-Dubz

Video Appearances listed by the following:
 Russell Brand
 Lady Gaga

DVD
As with the 2010 show, the filming of the 2011 was to have a DVD release by Universal Pictures.

See also
 2011 in British television
 List of stand-up comedians

References

External links
 Channel 4's Comedy Gala microsite
 Channel 4's Comedy Gala programme guide
 Great Ormond Street Hospital
 Off the Kerb Productions
 

2011 in British television
Channel 4 comedy
Health-related fundraisers
Great Ormond Street Hospital
Stand-up comedy concert films
Stand-up comedy on DVD
2011 in London